Kurt Flasch (born 12 March 1930, Mainz) is a German philosopher, who works mainly as a historian of medieval thought and of late antiquity. Flasch was professor at the Ruhr University Bochum. He was / is a member of several German and international Academies. In 2000, he was awarded the Sigmund Freud Prize by the Deutsche Akademie für Sprache und Dichtung.

Awards and recognitions 
Sigmund Freud Prize 2000
 Honorary Doctorate from University of Lucerne 2002
Hannah Arendt Prize 2009
 Honorary Doctorate from University of Basel 2010
Joseph Breitbach Prize 2012

Works

 

 Katholische Wegbereiter des Nationalsozialismus. Michael Schmaus, Joseph Lortz, Josef Pieper. Essay. Frankfurt, Vittorio Klostermann, 2021, ISBN 978-3-465-02706-5.

References

1930 births
Living people
20th-century German philosophers
21st-century German philosophers
German male writers
Members of the Göttingen Academy of Sciences and Humanities